Moje Menhardt (born 20 June 1934 in Hamburg) is an Austrian painter.

Life and career 
Moje Menhardt lives and works in Weitenegg and Vienna, Austria.  Before she had been living in Buenos Aires, Rio de Janeiro, Munich, Hamburg, Cologne and in Eindhoven, Holland.  After finishing College, she studied Jura in Vienna and later Painting at the Akademie voor Kunst en Vormgeving St. Joost in 's-Hertogenbosch in Netherlands, finishing studies at the Academy of Fine Arts Vienna, Vienna (Austria), Meisterschule für Malerei Professor Walter Eckert, 1980 with a Diploma.

Exhibitions (choice) 

Solo exhibition
 2016: PICTURES and DRAWINGS, Europaschloss Leiben
 2015: PICTURES AT AN EXHIBITION, Kultur.Herbst.Neubau, Wien 
 2014: DRAWINGS: WAYS – FLIGHT –  ENCOUNTER (WEGE –  FLUCHT –  BEGEGNUNG), Tainach/Tinje
 2013: IN BEWEGUNG, kultur forum amthof, Feldkirchen 
 2013: Popper  Sketches Sir Karl Popper-School, Vienna
 2012: Migrations, Kabelwerk ART_space Kabelwerk Wien-Meidling, Vienna
 2011: DONAUBILDER, Austrian Cultural Forum Budapest – DANUBE Culture Boat A 38
 2011: WASSER / WEGE / BILDER, Museum Roiten, Lower Austria
 2010: DANUBE PAINTINGS  – Donauklangraum by Rupert Huber, Vienna
 2010: WEGE und WERTE, Marienkron   
 2010: Vierzehn Arten den Regen darzustellen, Kabelwerk ART_space Kabelwerk Wien-Meidling
 2009: BILDER ohne WORTE, Seven rooms, Künstlerhaus Wien
 2008: SIEBEN WELTWUNDER DER ANTIKE, Foyer Kubinsaal, Schärding (Austria)
 2008: IMPULS & TANZ, Gotischer Kasten Gern, Eggenfelden
 2004: DANUBE – IMAGINARY BEINGS – PAINTINGS WITHOUT TITLE, Art Museum Los Gatos (California)
 2001/3: IMAGINARY BEEINGS (Jorge Luis Borges), Museums in Quito (Ecuador), Bogotá, Medellin, Ibague (Kolumbien) and Caracas, (Venezuela)
 2002: BILDER und ZEICHNUNGEN, Ägyptisches Kulturinstitut, Vienna
 2001: DANUBE PAINTINGS, DOMINIKANERKIRCHE Krems, Lower Austria
 1999: DANUBE PAINTINGS, Museum Moderner Kunst – Stiftung Wörlen, Passau
 1996: Museu Nacional de Belas Artes, Rio de Janeiro (Brasilien)
 1996: SEVEN WONDERS OF THE ANCIENT WORLD,  NÖ Landesmuseum, Vienna
 1995: Drawings, Cairo Berlin Art Gallery, Cairo
 1990: Drawings,  AUSTRIAN CULTURAL INSTITUTE, New York

Corporate collectors
Austrian Government, Wien; Oesterreichische Nationalbank; Museum Moderner Kunst Passau; Vienna, Austria; Passau, Germany; Krems, Austria; Passauer Neue Presse; Austrian Industries Vienna; Kapsch AG Vienna; Barclay's Bank, Miami, USA; Banco de Bilbao, Miami, USA; Klinik Hirslanden, Zürich; Nicolaus SA, São Paulo, Brasilien; NÖ Landesregierung St. Pölten; NÖ Dokumentationszentrum für Moderne Kunst St. Pölten; Sdružení Výtvarných Umečlců Jihovýchodní Moravy, Tschechien; Donauversicherung Wien, Vienna.

Literature 
 Dagmar Travner: Venire. Andare. Sieben europäische Künstler "Kommen und Gehen" auf der niederösterreichischen Burgruine Weitenegg im Donautal. Text und Kunstkritik zur Ausstellung, 2002.
 Moje Menhardt. Ausstellungskatalog, Passau 1999.
 Aperto – Wien. Der Wegweiser. Katalog, Wien 1995.
 Moje Menhardt. Miami M, ARTE 1994, Victoria Ryan Lobo (PDF)
 Clouds up high. fleeting figures in the sky  Springer Wien New York (PDF)

References

External links 
 Website Moje Menhardt official website
 artfacts.net  
 YouTube: Moje Menhardt about her paintings
 YouTube: Exhibition in Künstlerhaus Vienna
 Information about Moje Menhardt at basis wien

Living people
1934 births
Modern painters
21st-century Austrian painters
20th-century Austrian painters
Austrian women painters
20th-century Austrian women artists
21st-century Austrian women artists